Draining may refer to:

 Drainage, the natural or artificial process of water removal from land
 the urban exploration of sewers and storm drains

See also 
 Drain (disambiguation)